Alexandra Tsiavou (born 26 September 1985 in Igoumenitsa) is a Greek rower. She won the bronze medal (along with Christina Giazitzidou) at the 2012 Summer Olympics in London (lightweight double sculls) and she took the 6th place (along with Chrysi Biskitzi) at the 2008 Summer Olympics in Beijing (lightweight double sculls).

Biography and career
Tsiavou was born in Igoumenitsa, Greece, where she lives, and her origin is from Vrisella Filiates. As a child she was an athlete of artistic gymnastics but she left that sport due to her height (176 cm). In 1998 she turned to rowing as a member of her local nautical club. Three years later, she was member of the Greek national team for the first time. In 2006, she won the bronze medal at the World Rowing Championships. She took the 6th place (along with Chrysi Biskitzi) at the 2008 Summer Olympics in Beijing and in 2009 she won the gold medal along with Christina Giazitzidou at the Poznań's regatta. The following year, Tsiavou won the bronze medal in Karapiro and in 2011 she was first in Bled's world championship. Tsiavou won the bronze medal (along with Christina Giazitzidou) at the 2012 Summer Olympics in London (lightweight double sculls).

References

External links
 
 

1985 births
Living people
Greek female rowers
Olympic rowers of Greece
Rowers at the 2008 Summer Olympics
Rowers at the 2012 Summer Olympics
Olympic bronze medalists for Greece
Olympic medalists in rowing
Medalists at the 2012 Summer Olympics
World Rowing Championships medalists for Greece
European Rowing Championships medalists

People from Igoumenitsa
Sportspeople from Epirus (region)